Road to UFC is a 2022 Ultimate Fighting Championship (UFC) mixed martial arts (MMA) event series in which top Asian MMA prospects compete in a tournament to win UFC contracts. It features four divisions—flyweight, bantamweight, featherweight and lightweight—each for which eight fighters compete in a "win-and-advance" tournament format. The tournament winner for each division is awarded a UFC contract. Each event in the series is to feature five bouts including one non-tournament bout.

The opening quarterfinal round of the tournament is to be held across two days, June 9–10, 2022 at Singapore Indoor Stadium, with two five-bout events for each day for a total of 10 bouts per day, ahead of the pay-per-view event UFC 275 on June 11. The contestants for the tournament are expected to come from China (through the UFC Academy), India, Indonesia, Japan, Korea, the Philippines, and Thailand. The semifinal and final rounds are scheduled for later in 2022, with location and venue to be announced. Eventually, the semifinals took place on October 23, 2022 – a day after UFC 281 – in Abu Dhabi, UAE. The finals were initially scheduled to take place in Seoul, South Korea on February 4, 2023 at UFC Fight Night: Lewis vs. Spivak. However, the location for the event was changed to Las Vegas, Nevada with the date kept intact.

The "Road to UFC" branding was previously used in 2015 for Road to UFC: Japan, a similar Japan-based tournament awarding a UFC contract, formatted as a reality competition, and marketed as an Asian-centric analog to The Ultimate Fighter.

Episode 1

Episode 2

Episode 3

Episode 4

Episode 5

Episode 6

Flyweight tournament bracket

Bantamweight tournament bracket

* Xiao Long withdrew due to illness during fight week and no replacement was able to be found.
** Min Woo Kim missed weight (139.5 lbs), therefore the bout was canceled and Kazama proceeded to final

Featherweight tournament bracket

Lightweight tournament bracket

* Patrick Sho Usami suffered weight cut issues the day of weigh ins and no replacement was found.

External links
Road to UFC

See also
 Ultimate Fighting Championship
 Road to UFC

References

Ultimate Fighting Championship
Mixed martial arts events
2016 in mixed martial arts